The Expedition of Badr al-Maw'id was the third time Muhammad led an expedition in Badr. Modern historians date the event to October 625, though several alternative dates are found in primary sources.

A year after the Battle of Uhud, it was time for Muslims to meet the polytheists and start war again in order to determine which of the two parties was worthy of survival, according to Muslim scholar Safiur Rahman al Mubarakpuri.

The invasion helped the Muslims regain their military reputation, their dignity and managed to impose their presence over the whole of Arabia after the defeat at the Battle of Uhud. Quran 3:173-176 was reportedly divinely revealed to Muhammad during this event. The event and information about the verses is mentioned in the Sahih Bukhari hadith collection.

Background

According to William Muir, the two opposing forces were to meet again at Badr, and that year there was a great drought, Abu Sufyan the leader of the Meccan forces did not want to fight that season, and wished to defer the fighting to another, more-plentiful season. So Abu Sufyan told a man named Nuam from a neutral tribe to give an exaggerated account of the Meccan forces to deter Muhammad. The exaggerated report of Nuam scared some of the Muslims, and there was a disinclination to fight. Muhammad rejected this cowardly spirit and declared an oath that he would go to Badr, even if he went alone. Those bold words inspired such confidence that he was able to collect a force double what he had ever had before.

Invasion

According to the Sealed Nectar, Muhammad set out to Badr accompanied by 1500 fighters and 10 mounted horsemen, and with ‘Ali ibn Abi Talib as standard bearer. ‘Abdullah bin Rawahah was given authority over Madinah during Muhammad's absence. Reaching Badr, the Muslims stayed there waiting for the idolaters to come.

Abu Sufyan’s forces comprised 2000 footmen and 50 horsemen. They reached Mar Az-Zahran, some distance from Makkah, and camped at a water place called Mijannah. Being reluctant, discouraged and extremely terrified of the consequences of the approaching fight, Abu Sufyan turned to his people and began to introduce cowardice-based, flimsy pretexts in order to dissuade his men from going to war, saying:

His army were also possessed of the same fears and apprehensions, for they readily obeyed him without the least hesitation.

The Muslims, who were then at Badr, stayed for eight days waiting for their enemy. They took advantage of their stay by selling goods and earning double as much the price out of it. When the idolaters declined to fight, the balance of powers shifted to rest in favour of the Muslims, who thus regained their military reputation, their dignity and managed to impose their presence over the whole of Arabia.

Names of invasion
This invasion had many names. It has been called ‘Badr the Appointment’, ‘Badr, the Second’, ‘Badr, the Latter’ or ‘Badr Minor’.

Islamic primary sources

Quran 3:173-176
Quran 3:173-176 was reportedly divinely revealed to Muhammad during this event. It states:

The commentary of Ibn Abbas on verse 3:173 is as follows:

Biographical literature 
This event is mentioned in Ibn Hisham's biography of Muhammad. The Muslim jurist Ibn Qayyim Al-Jawziyya also mentions the event in his biography of Muhammad, Zad al-Ma'ad. Among the modern secondary sources which mention this, include the award winning book, The Sealed Nectar.

Hadith literature
Muhammad al-Bukhari mentioned in his hadith collection Sahih Bukhari:

See also
List of battles of Muhammad
Military career of Muhammad
Muslim–Quraysh War
Battle of Badr

Notes

625
Campaigns led by Muhammad
Badr